Transit is a 2006 film from Russian writer-director Aleksandr Rogozhkin, which was presented at the Karlovy Vary International Film Festival. Several of his past films have screened there, including Life with an Idiot and the Chechen war drama Check Point (Blokpost), for which he won the Best Director Prize in 1998. Transit is a story set on a secret military transit base in the remote Chukotka region, where planes from allied forces came in from Alaska, including quite a few with female pilots, which of course attracted the attention of the mostly male Russian crew at the base.

Plot summary
A group of American pilots from Alaska ferry Airacobra fighter planes across the ocean on Lend-lease. The orderly course of life is disrupted when it becomes clear that the American pilots are attractive and charming young women. The feelings of the Russian young men collide with cultural and language barriers resulting in a host of awkward, funny, and sometimes tragic situations.

Cast
Aleksei Serebryakov as Captain Yurchenko
Daniil Strakhov as Captain Lisnevsky
Anastasiya Nemolyaeva as Irina Zareva
Svetlana Stroganova as Valentina
Yuri Itskov as Svist
Stepan Abramov as Fitil'
Gennady Alekseyev as Wilson
Daniel Anderson as War Correspondent
Anna Marina Bensaud as Lieut. Jackson
Artem Bordovsky as Pulya
Sarah Bulley as Lieutenant Dana Adams
Christopher Delsman as Donald Svichkovsky aka 'Doc'
Andrei Fomin as Chernykh
Caterina Innocente as Lieutenant Mary McClain
Yevgeni Kachalov as Rozenfeld
Roman Kelchin as Semen
Sergei Konstantinov as Rintyn
Dmitri Lysenkov as Baron
Yekaterina Makarova as Rintyn's Wife
Oleg Malkin as Nulin
Sergey Medvedev as Os'
Aleksandr Orlovsky as Vasil'kov
Yuri Orlov as Romadanovsky
Sergei Pavlov as Roma
Grant Petrosian as Vano
Aleksey Petrov as Vasily
Ivan Prill as Turovsky
Sarah Margaret Rutley as Lieut. Tippy Kaufman
Zakhar Ronzhin as Kaiser
Anna Rud as Olga
Andrey Shibarshin as Morze
Mikhail Sivorin as Bologov
Ruslan Smirnov as Tutko
Kirill Ulyanov as Gutsava
Anatoli Ustinov as Petrov
Sergei Venzelev as Petya
Artem Volobuev as Shmatko
Nathan Thomas White as Pasco
Trigg Hutchinson as the Corporal

References

External links

 Trailer and Screenshots

2006 films
Films directed by Aleksandr Rogozhkin
2000s Russian-language films
Russian World War II films
Russian aviation films
Russian crime comedy-drama films
Russian historical comedy-drama films
Russian war comedy films